Biblical refers to something related to the Bible

Biblical may also refer to:

Music
 Biblical (song), a 2013 song by the band Biffy Clyro
 Biblical Songs, an 1894 song cycle by Antonín Dvořák

See also